The 2002–03 Armenian Hockey League season was the second season of the Armenian Hockey League, the first since 2001. Dinamo Yerevan won their first Armenian championship.

External links
Season on SFRP's Hockey Archive

Armenian Hockey League
Armenian Hockey League seasons
2002 in Armenian sport
2003 in Armenian sport